The Christian Broadcasting Network (CBN) is an American Christian media production and distribution organization. Founded in 1960 by Pat Robertson, it produces the long-running TV series The 700 Club, co-produces the ongoing Superbook anime, and has operated a number of TV channels and radio stations.

CBN has been described as having been "at the forefront of the culture wars since the network's inception in the early 1960s."

Operations 
One of the company's mainstays is The 700 Club, which uses a religious variety program that mixes sermons, interviews, and religious music (such as hymns and gospel). The name refers to a fundraising drive where Robertson successfully sought 700 viewers willing to contribute $10 a month to sustain the station. The 700 Club is the longest-running program in the variety format. Initially focused on devotional content, The 700 Club became increasingly political in the late 1970s, adding news segments.

Today, CBN News, provides news updates to The 700 Club and produces religious news programs such as CBN NewsWatch and Christian World News; it also produces a special hour-long block of prime time election coverage hosted by Robertson during American presidential and mid-term elections, airing on Freeform, which also carries The 700 Club and the half-hour talk show 700 Club Interactive. CBN also operates the CBN News Channel. The company also produces a version of The 700 Club aimed at Spanish speaking Americans (Club 700 Hoy).

CBN Asia manages Operation Blessing International Relief and Development Corporation (OBI), an international relief and missionary effort, and has international programming, producing local programs including Solusi in Indonesia and From Heart to Heart in Thailand.

CBN India produces three shows, a daily Hindi program Ek Nayee Zindagi, a bi-weekly Telugu program Nireekshana and an award-winning weekly Bengali program Samadhan.

CBN has broadcast programs in over 70 languages.

CBN now serves mainly as a production company for The 700 Club, and four other syndicated shows: CBN NewsWatch, Christian World News, 700 Club Interactive and The Brody File, a news-analysis program hosted by political journalist David Brody.

Some of CBN's programs also air on the Trinity Broadcasting Network, Cornerstone Television, FamilyNet, LeSEA Broadcasting Corporation, TCT and Middle East Television, all of which are Evangelical Christian networks. The secular commercial stations that continue to air The 700 Club in syndication (along with Freeform) air CBN's annual telethon during the last week of January.

The Charity Navigator gave CBN a 3-star overall rating, a 3-star financial rating and a 2-star accountability and transparency rating.

History

Beginnings 
CBN was founded in 1960 in Portsmouth, Virginia by Pat Robertson, who had recently become a born-again Christian. CBN entered into the broadcasting industry in October 1961, when WYAH-TV in Portsmouth – the group's flagship station – signed on the air. Its programming was funded by small donations from individuals and local churches.

In August 1962, WYAH-TV was joined by an FM sister station, Norfolk-licensed WXRI, which broadcast a format of Christian music and teaching programs.

In 1966, a daily talk program began on WYAH, which eventually became known as The 700 Club.

On July 7, 1968, CBN acquired the Neuvo Continente radio station in Bogota, Colombia (which was the first evangelical radio station in that country).

In 1969 the organisation established CBN Northeast, a simulcast network of five FM radio stations in upstate New York (WBIV in Wethersfield, WEIV in Ithaca, WJIV in Cherry Valley, WMIV in South Bristol and WOIV in DeRuyter). (The stations were previously the Rural Radio Network.)

CBN signed on WHAE-TV in Atlanta in June 1971. In January 1973, CBN purchased KBFI-TV in Dallas and changed its callsign to KXTX-TV. The ministry signed on its final station, WXNE-TV in Boston, in October 1977.

The ministry's broadcasting subsidiary, the Continental Broadcasting Network, ran its four over-the-air outlets as family-oriented independent stations – featuring a mix of religious programming (which took up most of its stations' Sunday schedules) and secular acquired programs, including westerns, sitcoms, drama series and children's programming. (This format that would be later adopted by the LeSEA Broadcasting Corporation when it began launching its own television stations in the 1970s.)

CBN transferred Neuovo Continente to Colombian pastor and broadcaster Ignacio Guevara on June 7, 1972.

The International 700 Club was first broadcast on November 7, 1976, in the Philippines. This 30 minute version of the US show was to go on to be broadcast in many other countries. This later became known as The 700 Club International.

On April 29, 1977, CBN launched a religious channel in the United States, the CBN Satellite Service.

Also that year, CBN University was founded. It was established for "the specific purpose of preparing leaders who would not only succeed in their professions but also advance as Christians equipped to effectively impact their world." Its first classes began in September 1978.

Affiliated charity Operation Blessing was set up on November 14, 1978. It was initially intended to help struggling individuals and families by matching their needs for items such as clothing, appliances, and vehicles with donated items from viewers of The 700 Club. Coordinating with local churches and other organizations, OBI expanded their matching funds program to also include food provisions and financial assistance for low-income families.

In June 1979, CBN joined George Otis Ministries to build a combined radio and TV station in Southern Lebanon. It then began to broadcast Christian programming 28 hours a week in Hebrew.

The 1980s 
CBN relocated its main headquarters from Portsmouth to Virginia Beach in 1980. About this time, CBN co-commissioned the first Superbook series of anime. This series was subsequently dubbed in many languages and distributed broadly across the world.

In June 1981,The 700 Club changed from being a religious talk show to having a news magazine format.

The CBN Satellite Service became the CBN Cable Network on September 1, 1981, and adopted a more secular programming format featuring a mix of family-oriented series and films while retaining some religious programs from various televangelists (mirroring the format used by CBN's broadcast stations). Its carriage grew to 10.9 million homes with a cable television subscription. The channel was notable for being one of the first cable channels to distribute its signal across the United States through satellite transmission (the third overall, after HBO and TBS). CBN Cable Network began airing a late night block of classic family oriented shows like You Bet Your Life with Groucho Marx, I Married Joan, and The Many Loves of Dobie Gillis.

The upstate New York radio stations were sold in 1982.

On April 10, 1982, a Christian-based television station in South Lebanon, Hope TV, was donated to CBN, and became Middle East Television (METV). At this time METV broadcast from Marjayoun. In Israel, METV was known for broadcasting WWF wrestling that was not available on Israeli TV. The station broadcast news, sports, family entertainment, and religious programming.

In August 1988, the CBN Cable Network became The CBN Family Channel.

Three of the over-the-air TV stations were sold between 1984 and 1989. WXRI radio in Portsmouth was also sold in 1989.

The 1990s 
On January 8, 1990, the national TV network was sold to related entity International Family Entertainment (IFE). IFE was majority owned by the Robertson family, with a minority interest held by John C. Malone. The sale was said to have been done because the channel had become too profitable for CBN to maintain its non-profit status. On September 15 that year, the newly sold channel rebranded as The Family Channel. It remained the most watched outlet for CBN programs. IFE went on to launch other TV channels in the US and UK, and planned to extend itself further.

1990 also saw CBN University become known as Regent University. CBN built luxury hotel The Founders Inn and Spa at the university campus, and this was completed in 1990. The name of the hotel refers to the US Founding Fathers.

The year 1990 was also when CBN programs began to be broadcast in the Soviet Union, and then in its successor states after they declared independence. It started with primetime specials, and later The 700 Club and Superbook. These broadcasts were followed by 190 rallies throughout the region that resulted in the establishment of 190 churches. Similar special projects were implemented in the Philippines and Romania in 1994.

CBN Asia was established in the Philippines & Hong Kong on October 1, 1994.

CBN launched its first website in March 1995. Also that year, Tagalog-language The 700 Club Asia began.

CBN Africa was established. In 1997, Turning Point International (TPi), an English-language magazine program for people of African descent around the world, began.

On June 5, 1997, METV launched its 24-hour programming broadcast on the Israeli satellite Amos 2. This allowed it to reach a potential audience of 200 million people in 15 nations including Israel, Jordan, Lebanon, Syria, Egypt and Cyprus.

IFE was sold to News Corporation later in June 1997. At this time, The Family Channel was the US's ninth largest cable network, reaching 67 million homes. The terms of the sale stipulated that the channel continue carrying The 700 Club in perpetuity. Pat Robertson said that "We expect to continue to benefit from The Family Channel's... growing family entertainment franchise." (The Family Channel was renamed Fox Family Channel in August 1998. The channel was then sold to The Walt Disney Company in 2001, which renamed it as ABC Family, later renaming it again to Freeform.)

On March 24, 1999, the inaugural live broadcast of The 700 Club Asia aired.

The 2000s 
CBN India was established in 2000. It has gone on to produce a number of TV shows in Hindi, Tamil and Bengali.

CBN's Dallas TV station was sold in 2000. METV was sold to LeSEA Broadcasting in July 2001.

In 2001, youth-oriented show, One Cubed, began in Asia. This later screened as One Cubed International in the US.

In September 2001, saw the launch of Living the Life, a new 30-minute magazine style show for women.

In October 2002, CBN launched CBN NewsWatch, a new half-hour weekend program.

Also in 2002, Le Club 700 began for people in Francophone Africa.

On September 18, 2003, a US version of One Cubed launched, featuring extreme sports, music videos, and celebrity interviews. A Nigerian version was also later created.

In 2004, Club 400 Hoy began as a daily program for Spanish speakers throughout the Americas.

CBN Europe was established in the UK. In October 2004, The 700 Club With Paul and Fiona began airing for UK audiences. It was hosted by Paul Jones and Fiona Hendley Jones. It was later dubbed in Dutch.

In 2005, kids program, A.S.T.I.G. (All Set to Imitate God), was launched by CBN Asia.

CBN Deutschland was established in 2007. Club 700 for German speakers, began on January 9, 2007. It was later renamed Erlebt TV in December 2019.

On April 30, 2007, First Landing, a CBN and Regent University produced movie about the English settlement of Jamestown, aired on ABC Family and various broadcast stations across the United States.

On April 29, 2008, the 24-hour CBN News Channel was launched as an online-only channel.

In November 2008, a new CBN Radio service was launched.

New TV program 700 Club Interactive began on May 25, 2009.

The 2010s 
In 2011, a newly rebooted Superbook series began to air in various countries, commissioned by CBN.

The 700 Club Canada, a weekdaily program, was launched in November 2011.

700 Club Nigeria began in about 2013.

New program Oyayi began to be made by CBN Asia in 2016.

On October 1, 2018, the CBN News Channel was relaunched. It was now made available over-the-air via 15 stations in the United States, as well as continuing online. It was based in Virginia Beach, and had bureaus in Washington DC and Jerusalem.

During the Trump administration (2017-2021), CBN hosted events at Trump properties, paying at least $170,000. Subsequently, CBN obtained access to the White House that far larger news outlets typically received, and were given frequent exclusive interviews with senior administration staff, including Trump himself.

The 2020s 
In 2020, music program CBN Asia Reverb began, which was later renamed Reverb Worship PH.

In October 2021, Club 400 Hoy was relaunched as a weekly US-focused program.

Programs

Current
The 700 Club – a daily newsmagazine that debuted in 1966, one of the longest runs of any program within that genre; the program is hosted by Pat Robertson (retired in 2021), Terry Meeuwsen and Gordon Robertson. The 700 Club features a daily news segment with commentary on certain stories, as well as interviews; it is distributed to an average daily audience of one million viewers, both on cable and through syndication.
Club 700 Hoy – a half-hour weekly Spanish-language version of The 700 Club that is syndicated throughout Latin America, and previously aired in the United States on Azteca America. The magazine-style formatted morning program features opinions on current issues; interviews; informative features; stories about people, places and music; and life advice.
CBN NewsWatch – produced by CBN News, it is a half-hour daily news program featuring reports on national and international news stories from a conservative, Christian perspective. It is broadcast nationally on several Christian-oriented cable and satellite networks.
Christian World News – produced by CBN News, it is a half-hour weekly conservative news program, that is broadcast nationally on the Trinity Broadcasting Network.
One Cubed USA and One Cubed International – aimed at teenagers and young adults between the ages of 13 and 24 years of age, the two programs focus on youth culture, action sports and music videos. It claims a mission statement "to reach this generation to express the unconditional love and salvation that God freely offered to everyone in this world. In everything that is One Cubed, we want to bring glory to God, never compromising and never settling, and always striving to be used by Him to the best of our abilities".

Notable personalities

Some of this info comes from The 700 Club, which lists The 700 Club hosts, as well as CBN News reporters, as well as former hosts of both.

Current
 Pat Robertson - co-host of The 700 Club (retired in 2021)
 Gordon P. Robertson - co-host of The 700 Club
 David Brody - host of The Brody File
 Terry Meeuwsen – co-host of The 700 Club and 700 Club Interactive
 Chuck Holton - military correspondent

Former
 Ben Kinchlow - co-host of The 700 Club
 Victor Oladokun 
 Sheila Walsh - co-host of The 700 Club
  Danuta Rylko Soderman - co-host of The 700 Club
 Lisa Ryan - co-host of The 700 Club 
 Susan Howard - co-host of The 700 Club

Broadcast stations 
In the following tables, former CBN-owned stations are arranged alphabetically by state and community of license.

Note: Two boldface asterisks appearing following a station's call letters (**) indicate a station which was built and signed on by CBN.

Former

Television stations 

In addition, CBN planned to build a television station in Richmond, Virginia, WRNX on UHF channel 63. However, CBN sold the construction permit for that station to National Capitol Christian Television in 1982, which signed on the station as WTLL in 1984. That station was eventually sold and in 1986, converted into secular independent station WVRN-TV, which shut down in 1988.

Notes:
1 CBN traded the broadcast license for KXTX-TV on channel 33 to Doubleday Broadcasting, in exchange for Doubleday's license to operate KDTV on channel 39, in November 1973;
2 Operated by LIN Media under a local marketing agreement from 1993 until 1997.

Radio stations

References

External links
 

 

Evangelical television networks
Christian mass media companies
Television networks in the United States
Companies based in Virginia Beach, Virginia
Freeform (TV channel)
Television channels and stations established in 1961
1961 establishments in Virginia
Conservative media in the United States